Dean Duane Benson (August 5, 1945 – January 26, 2019) was an American football linebacker and politician.

Football career
Benson played college football and track and field at Hamline University. Benson graduated from Hamline University in 1967. He played professionally in American Football League for the Oakland Raiders (1967–1969) and in the National Football League for the Raiders (1970–1971), the Atlanta Falcons (1972–1973), and the Houston Oilers (1974–1976).

Business and political career
Benson was a charter member of the Minnesota Sports Facilities Authority, created in 2012 to oversee construction of the state's new professional football stadium. He was the executive director of the Minnesota Business Partnership from 1994 to 2003. Benson owned and operated a cattle farm outside of Lanesboro, Minnesota.

Benson served in the Minnesota Senate, as a Republican, from 1980 to 1994 and was the Senate Minority Leader for six years.

Death
Benson died from cancer, on January 26, 2019, at the Methodist Hospital-Mayo Clinic, in Rochester, Minnesota.  He was 73.

See also
List of American Football League players

References

1945 births
2019 deaths
People from Lanesboro, Minnesota
People from Wright County, Iowa
Businesspeople from Minnesota
Farmers from Minnesota
Republican Party Minnesota state senators
Players of American football from Iowa
American football linebackers
Hamline Pipers football players
Oakland Raiders players
Atlanta Falcons players
Houston Oilers players
American Football League players
American athlete-politicians
Deaths from cancer in Minnesota
20th-century American businesspeople